Okawa Shaznay is a Nollywood actress from Cameroon and the first from her country to successfully break into Nollywood with her role in the blockbuster movie Iyore; starring alongside Rita Dominic and Joseph Benjamin. Okawa Shaznay has also gained more prominence with her leading role in the 2016 hit TV series Delilah: The Mysterious Case of Delilah Ambrose. She won the Exquisite Lady of the Year (ELOY) award for TV Actress of the year in 2016 for her role in Delilah.

Early life and background
Okawa Shaznay was born in Cameroon. She began her secondary school education in Presbyterian Secondary School Mankon, Bamenda, Cameroon. Shaznay later moved to the United States, where she graduated with a bachelor's degree in accounting from Texas Southern University.

Career

She also starred in the 2016 released movie project "REFUGEES" which was filmed in Ghana in 2012 and completed in Atlanta USA towards the later months of 2013.

Filmography

Awards and nominations

References

External links

 The emerging faces of Nollywood. IrokoTv 
 Okawa Shaznay shines bright in Iyore. IrokoTv
 refugees movie cast. SpyGhana.
 Dulce Camer's top 50 list. Dulce Camer.
 Cheaters movie. Bella Naija

Nigerian film actresses
Cameroonian actresses
Living people
21st-century actresses
People from Bamenda
Texas Southern University alumni
1986 births